Microchromis is a small genus of haplochromine cichlids which are endemic to Lake Malawi.

Species
There are two species in the genus Microchromis:

 Microchromis aurifrons Tawil, 2011
 Microchromis zebroides D.S. Johnson, 1975

Synonymy
Although FishBase recognises the genus Microchromis other authorities treat it as a junior synonym of Cynotilapia.

References

Haplochromini

Cichlid genera